James Leo Ryan (born November 19, 1932) is an inactive senior United States circuit judge of the United States Court of Appeals for the Sixth Circuit.

Education and career

Born in Detroit, Michigan, Ryan graduated from Detroit Catholic Central High School. He received a Bachelor of Laws from the University of Detroit School of Law in 1956. He received a Bachelor of Arts from the University of Detroit in 1992.  Ryan served as a law specialist in the United States Navy and was assigned to the Judge Advocate General and duty with the United States Marine Corps. Upon his release from active duty in 1960, he continued to serve in the Judge Advocate General's Corps of the United States Naval Reserve and, in 1992, retired from the Naval Reserve as a military judge with the rank of captain. He was in private practice of law in Detroit from 1960 to 1963. He was in private practice of law in Redford, Michigan from 1963 to 1966. He was a justice of the peace in Redford from 1963 to 1966. He was a judge of the circuit court for the Third Judicial Circuit, Michigan from 1966 to 1975. He has been an adjunct professor of law at the University of Detroit since 1974. He was a justice of the Supreme Court of Michigan from 1975 to 1985, having been appointed by Michigan Governor William G. Milliken. He was an adjunct professor at the Thomas M. Cooley Law School in Lansing, Michigan from 1979 to 1985.

Federal judicial service

Ryan was nominated by President Ronald Reagan on September 9, 1985, to a seat on the United States Court of Appeals for the Sixth Circuit vacated by Judge George Clifton Edwards Jr. He was confirmed by the United States Senate on October 16, 1985, and received commission on October 17, 1985. He assumed senior status on January 1, 2000. He took inactive senior status on September 3, 2010.

Teaching career
Ryan has extensive teaching experience.  He has served as an adjunct professor of law at Ave Maria School of Law, the University of Detroit School of Law, and the Thomas M. Cooley Law School. He has lectured on evidence, criminal procedure, and constitutional law at those institutions and at state and federal judicial training sessions in thirty states. He has served as a faculty member of the National Judicial College in Reno, Nevada, and the Appellate Judges Conference of the American Bar Association. Ryan has been awarded four honorary Doctor of Laws degrees.

Affiliations
Judge Ryan is a Knight of Malta. He is also involved with Angels' Place, an organization that provides residential living facilities to developmentally impaired adults.

Family

Ryan was married for fifty years to the Mary Elizabeth Ryan and had four children - Colleen (née Ryan) Hansen, Kathleen A. Ryan, Daniel P. Ryan, and James R. Ryan. He remarried widow Loretta Nagle and their blended families comprise 11 children and more than 41 grandchildren and great-grandchildren.

References

External links

 Michigan Supreme Court speeches
 Michigan Supreme Court history

1932 births
Living people
American Roman Catholics
Ave Maria School of Law faculty
Judges of the United States Court of Appeals for the Sixth Circuit
American justices of the peace
Knights of Malta
Michigan state court judges
Justices of the Michigan Supreme Court
Lawyers from Detroit
United States court of appeals judges appointed by Ronald Reagan
20th-century American judges
University of Detroit Mercy alumni
University of Detroit Mercy faculty
Detroit Catholic Central High School alumni